More is the third live album by contemporary classical ensemble Symphony Number One, featuring music by Natalie Draper, Andrew Posner, and Jonathan Russell. The album was released on December 16, 2016 and debuted to critical attention in local and national publications.

Track listing

Personnel
Symphony Number One

Additional musicians

Technical personnel

 Dan Rorke – producer
 Arun Ravendhran – engineer

References

External links 

2016 live albums
Symphony Number One albums